The Medvedev Doctrine is a set of five principles stated by President of Russia Dmitry Medvedev in an interview to Channel One Russia on Sunday August 31, 2008, in the aftermath of the Russo-Georgian War.  They may be summarized as follows:

 "Russia recognizes the primacy of the fundamental principles of international law"
 "The world should be multi-polar"
 "Russia does not want confrontation with any other country"
 "Protecting the lives and dignity of our citizens, wherever they may be, is an unquestionable priority for our country"
 "As is the case of other countries, there are regions in which Russia has privileged interests"

References

Politics of Russia
Dmitry Medvedev
2008 in Russia